(+)-α-pinene synthase (EC 4.2.3.121, (+)-α-pinene cyclase, cyclase I) is an enzyme with systematic name geranyl-diphosphate diphosphate-lyase [cyclizing, (+)-α-pinene-forming]. This enzyme catalyses the following chemical reaction

 geranyl diphosphate  (+)-α-pinene + diphosphate

Cyclase I of Salvia officinalis (sage) gives about equal parts (+)-α-pinene and (+)-camphene.

References

External links 
 

EC 4.2.3